Zafir or al-Zafir may refer to:

 Al-Zafir, a Fatimid caliph from 1149 to 1154
 Al-Ẓafīr, an ancient Arabian tribe
 Az Zafir, a village in western central Yemen
 Al-Zafir (missile), a short-range ballistic missile

People with the name
 Zafir Patel (born 1992), Indian cricketer
 Zafir Premčević (1872—1937), Serbian Chetnik commander

See also 
 Safir (disambiguation)
 Zafira, an Opel multi-purpose vehicle